Pikangikum Airport  is located  northeast of the First Nations community of Pikangikum, Ontario, Canada.

Airlines and destinations

See also
 Pikangikum Water Aerodrome

References

Certified airports in Kenora District